Clifford Silva Reuter III (November 15, 1927 – July 27, 2021) was an American politician in the state of Florida.

Early life and education
Reuter was born in Scarsdale, New York (Bronxville Hospital) on November 15, 1927, to Clifford Silva Reuter II and Louise Hull Reuter. He attended the Berkshire School in Massachusetts and enlisted in the US Army as a private during the second world war.
In 1951, he earned a BS in Business Administration & Electrical Engineering from the University of New Hampshire.

He moved to Florida in 1958.

Career
Reuter was elected to the state senate for the 30th district (comprising Space Coast and Treasure Coast) in 1966 and served until 1971. While he served as a Republican Florida Senator, he later became a member of the Democratic party. During his senate tenure, he worked towards authorizing the creation of Disney World, the 528 Beeline Causeway, and Florida's Aquaculture Farming Industry.

References

2021 deaths
1927 births
University of New Hampshire alumni
Berkshire School alumni
Florida state senators
People from Bronxville, New York
Florida Republicans
Florida Democrats